Merin may refer to:

 Měřín – a town in the Czech Republic
 Merîn – a village in Aleppo Governorate, Syria

See also
 Merino (disambiguation)